Sotouboua Prefecture is a prefecture of the Centrale Region of Togo. Its principal town is Sotouboua. At the time of the 2010 census it had a population of 158,425 people.

Populated places
 Ayengre
 Mpoti
 Sotouboua

References

Prefectures of Togo
Centrale Region, Togo